The Gold Eagle Reserve is an Indian reserve of the Mosquito, Grizzly Bear's Head, Lean Man First Nations in Saskatchewan. It is an urban reserve in the city of North Battleford.

References

Urban Indian reserves in Canada
Indian reserves in Saskatchewan
Division No. 16, Saskatchewan